The Israel Defense Forces 210th Division, known also as the Bashan" Division, is a territorial division in the IDF Northern Command, responsible for the front with Syria. The division was formed after the 366th "Netiv Ha-Esh/Path of Fire" (Reserve) Armor Division of Southern Command was disbanded.

Units
 210th "Bashan" Division
 474th "Golan" (Territorial) Brigade
 9th "Oded" (Reserve) Infantry Brigade
 679th "Yiftah" (Reserve) Armor Brigade
810th Hermon Brigade (In Hebrew)
 Alpinist Unit 
 209th "Kidon" (Reserve) Artillery Regiment
 "Bashan" Division Signal Battalion
 595th "Ayit/Eagle" Field Intelligence Battalion
6366th "Ayit/Eagle" Logistics Battalion
Heavy Engineer Company "Chatul/Cat" 

Divisions of Israel
Northern Command (Israel)